Dăbâca is a commune in Cluj County, Transylvania, Romania. It is composed of three villages: Dăbâca, Luna de Jos (Kendilóna), and Pâglișa (Poklostelke).

Geography
The commune lies on the banks of the river Lonea. Dăbâca borders the following communes: Panticeu to the north, Cornești and Iclod to the east, Borșa and Bonțida to the south, and Vultureni to the west.

Demographics
According to the census from 2002 there was a total population of 1,804 people living in this commune. Of this population, 87.91% are ethnic Romanians, 7.53% are ethnic Hungarians, and 4.43% ethnic Romani.

References

External links

Communes in Cluj County
Localities in Transylvania